Julian (Jules) Christopher Paul Eden is an author, journalist, businessman and former doctor with specialisms in remote medicine and dive medicine. He was the founder of the UK's first online medical clinic, e-Med in 2000.

Early life
Born in 1962, Eden received his mid-term degree in Psychology, at Bedford College and matriculated in 1988 from the combined Charing Cross and Westminster Medical School, (now part of Imperial College, London).  He then worked in the UK National Health Service (NHS) and joined the North Devon vocational training scheme based at the North Devon District Hospital Barnstaple,  before becoming a General Practitioner in Victoria, London. After working with London's homeless at The Passage refuge in Pimlico he created the “Homeless Medipac”, a medical kit to help the homeless with basic medical problems in 1999.

Online medicine
Eden was responsible for creating the first online medical service in the UK,  the e-med online medical clinic, in March 2000, offering diagnosis and prescriptions over the internet. At the time, his practice was considered by the GMC to "represent serious and repeated departures from the most basic standards required of a competent medical practitioner" and that 'the panel's view based on the evidence given is that you're a businessman first and a clinician second". At his GMC hearing Eden was deemed to be "evasive, unreliable and at times untrustworthy" and he was removed from the GMC register in 2009. However, some aspects of the model he established are now used by NHS Direct (currently NHS Choices) the free health advice and information service provided by the National Health Service (NHS) for residents and visitors in the UK, with advice offered 24 hours a day via telephone and web contact (over 1.5 million patients visit the website every month.) and a new generation of online doctors in the UK including the Now Healthcare Group, Dr Fox Pharmacy, Push Doctor and Lloyds Pharmacy.

SCUBA and dive medicine
An avid SCUBA diver, in 2000 Eden created the “Medipac”, a travel health kit now used by thousands of divers and travelers worldwide.

Eden also inaugurated and manages the Dive Lectures, a series of public lectures that have been hosted at the Royal Geographical Society in London every year since 2005 as part of an ongoing programme of events by the Society to promote exploration and adventure sports. Featuring keynote presentations by well-known figures in diving, television, exploration, photography and environmentalism, the lectures have developed into a well-attended social and professional forum for the British scuba industry as well as a popular fund-raising occasion for diving-related charities.

Journalism and broadcasting
A writer and columnist for The Independent on travel medical issues, he also wrote “the Flying Doctor” column for the Guardian newspaper between 2002 and 2004. He wrote a medical column for Sport Diver Magazine from 2000 to 2007.

At the beginning of 2000, Eden became the resident medical commentator on BBC's London 94.9 and London Live. He then went on to present “Second Opinion with Dr Jules Eden” on LBC, London between 2001 and 2004. He also co-hosted the programme “Wanda and the Doc” for Whereitsat.tv from 2001 to 2003.

In 2006, he co-authored 50 Reasons to Hate the French, a humorous look at the history of Anglo-French relations, which became a New York Times List best-seller. Criticism by Le Figaro following its release prompted Eden to defend the book as a merely satirical work.

In 2012, he wrote FAQ Dive Medicine, a guide to the medical aspects of diving for both professional and amateur divers.

Birdwatching
Eden is a keen birdwatcher. In 2021, he was listed as #125 in Surfbirds' World Rankings of prominent birders

References

External links
e-Med Medical Services
London Dive Magazine

1962 births
Living people
21st-century British medical doctors
British general practitioners
21st-century English writers